Ernest Kemm (born 18 November 1990) is a South African cricketer. He was included in the Easterns cricket team squad for the 2015 Africa T20 Cup. In September 2018, he was named in Limpopo's squad for the 2018 Africa T20 Cup. In April 2021, he was named in Northern Cape's squad, ahead of the 2021–22 cricket season in South Africa.

References

External links
 

1990 births
Living people
South African cricketers
Easterns cricketers
Limpopo cricketers
People from Potchefstroom